Raimond Lis (30 August 1888 – 21 December 1916) was a French gymnast. He competed in the men's team event at the 1908 Summer Olympics. Lis was a gymnast teacher, and a multi-time regional champion in Belgium. A lieutenant in the army, he was killed in action during World War I.

References

External links
 

1888 births
1916 deaths
French male artistic gymnasts
Olympic gymnasts of France
Gymnasts at the 1908 Summer Olympics
People from Armentières
Sportspeople from Nord (French department)
20th-century French people